is a kanji dictionary published with English speakers in mind. Although a revised edition by John H. Haig, The New Nelson Japanese-English Character Dictionary, was published in 1997, it is still in print, now under the title The Original Modern Reader's Japanese-English Character Dictionary – Classic Edition

The dictionary contains about 5,000 entries, listing characters with their on and kun readings, compounds and English definitions. The entries are arranged by a system devised by the author as an extension of the traditional radical system.

References 

Japanese dictionaries